Johnson C. Taylor (November 27, 1849 – February 25, 1931) was an American politician in the state of Washington. He served in the Washington House of Representatives.

References

Republican Party members of the Washington House of Representatives
People from Grant County, Wisconsin
1849 births
1931 deaths
People from Orting, Washington